Mount Despair may refer to:

Mount Despair (Montana) in Glacier National Park (U.S.)
Mount Despair (Victoria) in Victoria, Australia
Mount Despair (Washington) in North Cascades National Park